HD 94717, also known as HR 4268, is a solitary orange hued star located in the southern circumpolar constellation Chamaeleon. It has an apparent magnitude of 6.34, placing it near the limit for naked eye visibility. At its current distance, HD 94717's brightness is diminished by 0.62 magnitudes due to interstellar dust.

HD 94717 has a stellar classification of K2 II/III, indicating that it is an evolved red giant with the blended luminosity class of a giant star and a bright giant. It is estimated to be 63 million years old, enough time for it to cool and expand to 78 times the Sun's radius.

References

K-type giants
K-type bright giants
Chamaeleon (constellation)
Chamaeleontis, 28
CD-78 00438
094717
053151
4268